Villalstonine is a bisindole alkaloid isolated from Alstonia with in vitro antiplasmodial activity.

References

Alkaloids found in Apocynaceae
Tryptamine alkaloids
Quinolizidine alkaloids